Maili-Jade Ouellet (born 2002) is a Canadian chess player, who holds the title Woman Grandmaster.

Biography
Ouellet learned to play chess as a child and began competing in tournaments at 7 years of age.

In 2014, Ouellet won the Canadian Youth Chess Championship in the girls U12 age group. In 2018, she won the girls U16&U18 category.

In 2017, she won the Women's Canadian Chess Championship, which also acted as the women's Zonal 2.1 tournament that year, thus qualifying for the Women's World Chess Championship 2018.

Ouellet has played for Canada three times in the Women's Chess Olympiad:
 In 2016, at reserve board in the 42nd Chess Olympiad in Baku (+5, =0, -2),
 In 2018, at third board in the 43rd Chess Olympiad in Batumi (+5 =2 -3).
 In 2022, at first board in the 44th Chess Olympiad in Chennai (+6 =1 -4).

In 2016, she was awarded the Woman International Master (WIM) title. She received the Woman Grandmaster (WGM) title in 2020 for winning the 2019 American Continental Women's Championship in Aguascalientes, Mexico .

In April 2022, Ouellet won the 2022 Canadian Women's Chess Championship in Kingston, Ontario, with a perfect score of 9/9.

References

External links

Maili-Jade Ouellet chess games at 365Chess.com

2002 births
Living people
Canadian female chess players
Chess woman grandmasters
Chess Olympiad competitors
Date of birth missing (living people)
Place of birth missing (living people)